Suji Kwock Kim (also S. K. Kim) is a Korean-American-British poet-playwright.

Life
She was educated at Yale College, the University of Iowa Writers' Workshop, Seoul National University and Yonsei University, where she was a Fulbright Scholar, and Stanford University, where she was a Stegner Fellow.

Her work has been published in The Best American Poetry, The New York Times, The Washington Post, Los Angeles Times, The Guardian, New Statesman, Irish Examiner, Slate, The Nation, The New Republic, The Paris Review, London Magazine, Poetry London, Poetry Review and Poetry, recorded for BBC Radio, National Public Radio, the Canadian Broadcasting Corporation, Radio Free Genoa, and Radio Free Amsterdam,  and translated into Russian, German, Spanish, Italian, Croatian, Korean, Japanese, Arabic, and Bengali.

Music and theatre 
Choral settings of her poems, composed by Mayako Kubo for the Tokyo Philharmonic Chorus, Chorusorganisation, Koreanische Frauengruppe Berlin, and Japanische Fraueninitiative Berlin, premiered at Pablo Casals Hall, Tokyo in December 2007. Vocal settings of her work, composed by Jerome Blais, premiered at Dalhousie University in Halifax, Nova Scotia, and were recorded by the Canadian Broadcasting Corporation (CBC) in March 2007.  It was later performed by the Solera Quartet at the Art Institute of Chicago, May 2019, and recorded by WFMT-Chicago.   She is co-author of Private Property, a multimedia play showcased at Playwrights Horizons (NY), produced at the Edinburgh Festival Fringe (UK), and featured on BBC-TV.

Awards 
 The Nation/ Discovery Award
 Walt Whitman Award from the Academy of American Poets
 Addison Metcalf Award from the American Academy of Arts and Letters  
 Whiting Writers' Award
 Northern California Book Award/ Bay Area Book Reviewers Award
 Griffin International Poetry Prize shortlist
 Lucille Medwick Award from the Poetry Society of America
 two George Bogin Memorial Awards from the Poetry Society of America
 O'Donoghue Award from Munster Literature Centre, Ireland
 Clore Award from Poetry London, U.K.
 International Book & Pamphlet Award, U.K.

Works 
 Notes from the Divided Country (Louisiana State University Press, 2003)
 Notes from the North (Smith/Doorstop, U.K., 2022)
 Private Property (multimedia play, Edinburgh Festival Fringe)
 "hwajon," "Flight," "Looking at a Yi Dynasty Rice Bowl" (texts for choral compositions by Mayako Kubo, Tokyo Philharmonic Chorus, 2007)
 "Occupation," "Fragments of the Forgotten War," "Montage with Neon" (texts for compositions for voice and piano by Jerome Blais, Dalhousie University, Halifax, Nova Scotia, 2007 and Art Institute of Chicago, May 2019)

Anthologies 
 American Religious Poems, ed. Harold Bloom. (Library of America, 2006)
 American War Poetry: 1700-2020, ed. Lorrie Goldensohn. (Columbia University Press, 2021)
 Asian-American Poetry: The Next Generation. (University of Illinois Press, 2004)
 Backpack Literature, ed. Dana Gioia. (Pearson Longman, 2021)
 The Bedford Introduction to Literature, 13th edition (Macmillan, forthcoming)
 Berliner Anthologie (Alexander Verlag, in association with Internationales Literaturfestival Berlin, 2006)
 Best American Poetry 2018. (Scribner, 2018)
 Best American Poetry 2016. (Scribner, 2016)
 Century of the Tiger: One Hundred Years of Korean Culture in America. (University of Hawaii Press, 2003)
 Contemporary American Poetry. (Penguin, 2004)
 Contemporary American Poetry in Russian Translation. (Dalkey Archive and OSI Publishers, Moscow, 2008, sponsored by the National Endowment for the Arts)
 Crossing State Lines: An American Renga. (Farrar, Straus and Giroux, 2011)
 Echoes Upon Echoes: New Korean American Writing, ed. Elaine Kim. (Temple University Press, 2003)
 The Future Dictionary of America, ed. Dave Eggers. (McSweeney's, 2004)
 The Griffin Poetry Prize Anthology. (House of Anansi Press, Toronto, 2004)
 Inside Literature. (Pearson Longman, 2007)
 An Introduction to Poetry.  (Pearson Longman, 2012)
 The Koreas, Charles Armstrong. (Routledge, 2013)
 Language for a New Century: Contemporary Voices from the Middle East, Asia and Beyond. (Norton, 2008)
 Legitimate Dangers: American Poets of the New Century. (Sarabande, 2006)
 Lineas Conectadas: Nueva Poesia de los Estates Unidos. (Sarabande, 2006, in Spanish translation, sponsored by the National Endowment for the Arts)
 Literature: A Pocket Anthology. (Penguin, 2017)
 Literature: A Portable Anthology. (Macmillan/ Bedford St Martin's, 2020)
 Literature: An Introduction to Fiction, Poetry, Drama, and Writing. (Pearson Longman, 2019)
 Love is Strong as Death. (Penguin Australia-New Zealand, 2019)
 A Mingling of Waters. (Supernova P&D Pvt. Ltd., Kolkata, India, 2008, sponsored by the Kolkata Book Fair)
 The Paris Review Book for Planes, Trains, Elevators and Waiting Rooms. (Picador, 2004)
 Places of Poetry: Mapping the Nation in Verse (Poetry Society/ One World, U.K., 2020)
 Poet's Choice: Poems from the Washington Post (Harcourt, 2006)
 Poetry: A Pocket Anthology. (Penguin, 2014)
 Poetry For Students. (Thomson Gale, 2006)
 Poetry On Record, 1888-2006: 98 Poets Read Their Work. (Shout Factory/ Sony Music, 2006)
 Poetry 30. (University of West Virginia Press, 2005)
 Roots and Seeds. (Hazel Press, U.K., 2022)
 Staying Human. (Bloodaxe, U.K., 2020)
 To Gather Your Leaving: Asian Diaspora Poetry. (Ethos Books, Singapore, 2019)

References

External links 
 Suji Kwock Kim Website
 "Notes from the North"
 The Guardian Poem of the Week
 National Public Radio interview
 "Poet's Choice", Washington Post, Robert Pinsky, August 27, 2006
 Los Angeles Times "Drunk Metaphysics"
 Profile at The Whiting Foundation
 Griffin Poetry Prize biography 
 Griffin Poetry Prize reading, including video clip 
 2005 University of California at Berkeley video clip
 National Book Festival (Library of Congress) profile and video clip
 

American poets
American dramatists and playwrights of Korean descent
American writers of Korean descent
Living people
Stanford University alumni
Seoul National University alumni
Yale College alumni
Iowa Writers' Workshop alumni
American women dramatists and playwrights
American women poets
Year of birth missing (living people)
21st-century American women